The Captain's Daughter  is a 2000 Russian drama film directed by Aleksandr Proshkin. The film is an adaptation of the historical novel The Captain's Daughter (1836) by Alexander Pushkin.

Plot 
The film takes place during the reign of Catherine the Great. Yemelyan Pugachev declared himself Emperor Peter III of Russia, uniting around him detachments of Cossacks and fugitive serfs. Meanwhile, in the Belogorsk fortress, officer Pyotr Grinyov met with the daughter of Captain Mironov, whom he fell in love with so much that he did not notice the signs of future trouble.

Cast 
 Mateusz Damiecki as Pyotr Grinyov
 Karolina Gruszka as Masha Mironova
 Vladimir Mashkov as Yemelyan Pugachev
 Sergei Makovetsky as Aleksei Shvabrin
 Vladimir Ilyin as Savelyich
 Yury Belyayev as Commandant Mironov  
 Natalya Egorova as Vasilisa Egorovna
 Yury Kuznetsov as Ivan Ignatyevich
 Olga Antonova as Catherine the Great
 Juozas Budraitis as Governor of Orenburg
 Pyotr Zaychenko as Pyanov
 Maria Mironova as Kharlova

References

External links 
 

2000 films
2000s Russian-language films
2000s historical drama films
2000 drama films
French historical drama films
Films based on works by Aleksandr Pushkin
Films set in the 1770s
Films about Catherine the Great
Russian historical drama films
The Captain's Daughter
2000s French films